The 1993–94 Ukrainian Second League was the third season of 3rd level professional football in Ukraine.

Teams

Relegated teams
 Ros Bila Tserkva - (debut)
 Shakhtar Pavlohrad - (debut)

Promoted teams
 Naftokhimik Kremenchuk - winner of the Third League (debut)
 Dynamo Luhansk - runner-up of the Third League (debut)
 Nyva-Borysfen Boryspil - fourth in the Third League (debut)
 Metalurh Kerch placed fifth in the Third League (returning after a year of absence)
 Shakhtar Shakhtarsk - sixth in the Third League (returning after a year of absence)

Renamed teams
 Prior to the season Nyva-Borysfen Myronivka was renamed into Borysfen Boryspil first and then simply Boryspil;
 During the season Zirka Kirovohrad was renamed into Zirka-NIBAS Kirovohrad
 During the season Shakhtar Shakhtarsk was renamed into Medita Shakhtarsk
 During the season Shakhtar-2 Donetsk was renamed into Metalurh Kostiantynivka
 During the season Voikovets Kerch was renamed into Metalurh Kerch
 During the season Vahonobudivnyk Stakhanov was renamed into Shakhtar Shtakhanov

Relocated teams
 Before the season Druzhba Berdyansk moved from the neighboring Osypenko, Berdyansk Raion to Berdyansk city.

Location map

Standing table

Top goalscorers

See also
 Ukrainian First League 1993-94
 Ukrainian Third League 1993-94
 1993-94 Ukrainian Cup

References

External links
 1993-94 Ukrainian Transitional League (Aleksei Kobyzev, Russian)
 1993-94 Ukrainian Transitional League (Dmitriy Troschiy, Russian)

Ukrainian Second League seasons
3
Ukra